Mahankal Rural Municipality , is a Rural Municipality in Lalitpur District in Bagmati Province of Nepal that was established in 2017 by merging the former Village development committees Bukhel, Manikhel, Gotikhel, Chandanpur, Kaleshwar and Thuladurlung. The centre of this rural municipality is located at Old-Gotikhel.

Demographics
At the time of the 2011 Nepal census, Mahankal Rural Municipality had a population of 9,526. Of these, 58.2% spoke Nepali, 40.6% Tamang, 0.4% Sunwar, 0.3% Newar, 0.2% Maithili, 0.1% Pahari and 0.2% other languages as their first language.

In terms of ethnicity/caste, 48.1% were Hill Brahmin, 41.1% Tamang, 6.2% Chhetri, 1.1% Damai/Dholi, 1.1% Brahmu/Baramo, 0.8% Kami, 0.4% Sunuwar, 0.4% Newar and 0.8% others.

In terms of religion, 59.3% were Hindu, 39.8% Buddhist and 0.9% Christian.

References 

Rural municipalities in Lalitpur District, Nepal
Rural municipalities of Nepal established in 2017